Glory Emmanuel Edet  is a Nigerian princess and women & child-rights activist. She is a two-time Commissioner for Ministry of Women Affairs and Social Welfare in Akwa Ibom state. She was first appointed in 2013, and re-appointed for the same position in 2015 by Udom Gabriel Emmanuel. In 2015, she  started an empowerment scheme for widows which selected participants equally from all 31 local government areas of the State. The scheme provided the widows with stat-up funds to float their businesses. In support of vulnerable children in Akwa-Ibom state, Glory Emmanuel Edet has worked with the United States Agency for International Development (USAID) and Association for Reproductive and Family Health (ARFH).

She is a great mobilizer of women, who has worked passionately on issues of gender, the less privileged and the vulnerable members of the society. She worked as a lecturer in the Department of Agricultural Economics and Extension, University of Uyo, prior to her appointment as a Commissioner by the State government.  Dr Glory Edet is a member of various professional bodies.

Early life and career
Glory is a Nigerian advocate of women and child's rights.
She was appointed twice as commissioner for Ministry of Women Affairs and Social Welfare in Akwa Ibom State.

Education 
A star in her own right, Dr. Edet was adjudged the Best Graduating Student of the University of Uyo, Department of Agricultural Economics and Extension, during her first degree program.

After obtaining her first degree in 2003, Edet proceeded to the University of Ibadan, where she obtained her M.Sc in Agricultural Economics and Doctor of Philosophy (Ph.D) in Resource and Environmental Economics, from Michael Okpara University of Agriculture, Umudike, Abia State.

References

Living people
Nigerian women in politics
People from Akwa Ibom State
Year of birth missing (living people)